井 is a Chinese word for well. It may also mean:

 Jing (surname)
 Well (Chinese constellation)
 I Ching hexagram 48